Cathy Corison is an American winemaker, entrepreneur and consultant. She specializes in Cabernet Sauvignon. Corison was the San Francisco Chronicle Winemaker of the Year in 2011.

Personal life and education
Cathy Corison grew up in Riverside, California. She studied biology at Pomona College and was on their men's diving team, because the school didn't have a women's team. In 1972, she had to take an extracurricular class. Using her diving skills she decided to sign up for a trampoline class, but changed her mind upon seeing a sign-up sheet for a wine tasting class. This class was the catalyst for garnering Corison's interest in winemaking. After graduation in 1975, she moved to Napa Valley in California. She received her Master's degree in Enology from University of California, Davis.

Career
Upon moving to Napa, she started working in the tasting room at Sterling Vineyards and at a wine shop. During this time, she was getting her Master's degree at the University of California, Davis. She was told by her professor that she would not get a job in Napa Valley because of being a woman. She tried to get a job at Freemark Abbey and was denied the job. Part of the reasons the owners gave was because she was too short and they believed she could not work in the wine cellar. She almost started working at Christian Brothers in the enology lab.

As part of a larger pattern of sexism in the wine industry at the time, many women worked in labs and weren't allowed to be winemakers. Corison decided against working in the lab and in 1978 she became an intern at Freemark Abbey. She eventually became a winemaker for the winery. She then joined Chappellet Winery, in 1983, as head winemaker, working there for almost ten years. At Chappellet she was able to focus on developing her skills at creating Cabernet Sauvignon wines. She dislikes wines with high alcohol content and fruit forward wines. She does not add additives of acids to her wine.

Corison Winery
She founded her own winery, Corison Winery, in 1987. The winery is located in St. Helena, California in a barn built by Corison's husband, William Martin. Corison Winery makes Cabernet and Gewürztraminer wines and produces 3,500 cases a year. The winery makes a Kronos Vineyard Cabernet Sauvignon and a Napa Valley Cabernet Sauvignon. The Kronos is an estate wine and made from organic grapes. The vineyard is dry farmed. The grapes come from one of the oldest vineyards in Napa Valley. The Napa Valley Cabernet comes from Rutherford. The Gewürztraminer is called Corazón and comes from the Anderson Valley AVA.

Awards and acknowledgements
 2011, San Francisco Chronicle Winemaker of the Year

References

External links
 
 Official website

Oenologists
People from Riverside, California
Pomona College alumni
University of California, Davis alumni
Wineries in Napa Valley
American winemakers
Living people
People from St. Helena, California
American female winemakers
American viticulturists
Wine merchants
Year of birth missing (living people)